"Hey Nonny Nonny" may refer to:

 "Hey nonny nonny" or variations, a nonsense refrain popular in English music during the Elizabethan era
 Hey Nonny Nonny!, a 1932 American musical with music by William C. K. Irwin and lyrics by Michael H. Cleary and others
 "Hey Nonny Nonny", a song by Violent Femmes from the 1991 album Why Do Birds Sing?
 "Hey Nonny Nonny", a 2012 episode of the American sitcom Best Friends Forever